Philippe Lefebvre may refer to:

 Philippe Lefebvre (actor) (born 1968) French actor
 Philippe Lefebvre (film director) (born 1941), French film director
Philippe Lefebvre (organist) (born 1949), French church and concert organist
Philippe Lefebure, also spelled Lefebvre (born 1908), French ice hockey player